Deathblow or Death Blow may refer to:

death blow
Coup de grace
Dissecting aortic aneurysm

Comics
Deathblow (comics) is a fictional character in the Wildstorm Universe

TV
"Death Blow" is a fictional movie in the Seinfeld episode "The Little Kicks"

Music
A song by the alternative metal band Deftones included in their fourth studio album.